WPLR (99.1 MHz, also known as "99.1 PLR" or Connecticut's #1 Rock Station). licensed to New Haven, Connecticut, is a classic rock station owned by Connoisseur Media as of May 10, 2013. The station's playlist includes Jimi Hendrix, Led Zeppelin, Pearl Jam and modern rock. PLR is a traditional ratings powerhouse in Southern Connecticut, though it provides city-grade coverage to most of the state, including Hartford. The station can also be received in some parts of the Pioneer Valley.

The station, which first went on the air in 1948 as WNHC-FM, has a history as a pioneer in the AOR format, with which it has closely identified since its inception in the early 1970s.

The physical location of the station has also changed as the studios are now co-located with other Connoisseur radio stations on Wheelers Farms Road in Milford. Previously, the studios were located on Dixwell Avenue in Hamden and prior to that the offices and studios were located on Chapel Street in New Haven. The station's transmitter is on Madmare Mountain in Hamden near the WTNH transmitter site.

WPLR-HD2
On September 18, 2017, at 10:23 a.m. WPLR launched an alternative rock format on its HD2 subchannel, branded as "Mod 102.3" (simulcast on translator W272DO 102.3 FM New Haven). The first song on Mod was "First" by Cold War Kids.

W272DO was sold to Red Wolf Broadcasting in January 2018. On January 15, it immediately ceased simulcasting "Mod" and began carrying Spanish CHR "Bomba" from WMRQ-HD2.

As of November 24, 2019, WPLR-HD2 is no longer broadcasting the "Mod" format and is now simulcasting WICC 600 AM.

References

External links

Mass media in New Haven, Connecticut
PLR
Classic rock radio stations in the United States
Connoisseur Media radio stations
Radio stations established in 1948
1948 establishments in Connecticut